The women's 15 kilometre skiathlon cross-country skiing competition at the 2014 Sochi Olympics took place at 14:00 (MSK) on 8 February 2014 at Laura Biathlon & Ski Complex.

The defending champion was Marit Bjørgen from Norway, who also became the 2014 Olympic champion. The 2010 silver medalist Anna Haag did not participate, and the 2010 bronze medalist, Justyna Kowalczyk, finished sixth. Charlotte Kalla from Sweden became the silver medalist, and Heidi Weng from Norway took bronze.

A large group of skiers kept together at the classical part of the course, but in the free skiing part soon a group of five skiers took the lead. The group included Bjørgen, Kalla, Weng, Therese Johaug, and Aino-Kaisa Saarinen. Shortly before the finish, Kalla escaped but was overtaken by Bjørgen at the finish line.

Qualification

An athlete with a maximum of 100 FIS distance points (the A standard) was allowed to compete in both or one of the event (sprint/distance). An athlete with a maximum 120 FIS sprint points was allowed to compete in the sprint event and 10 km for women or 15 km for men provided their distance points did not exceed 300 FIS points. NOC's who do not have any athlete meeting the A standard could enter one competitor of each sex (known as the basic quota) in only 10 km classical event for women or 15 km classical event for men. They must have had a maximum of 300 FIS distance points at the end of qualifying on 20 January 2014. The qualification period began in July 2012.

Competition schedule
All times are (UTC+4).

Results
The race was started at 14:00.

References

Women's cross-country skiing at the 2014 Winter Olympics
Women's pursuit cross-country skiing at the Winter Olympics